Mugurel Florin Cornățeanu (born 21 February 1972) is a Romanian former professional footballer who played as a midfielder. In his career Cornățeanu played in Divizia A for teams such as: Farul Constanța and Steaua București and in Divizia B for Callatis Mangalia, Portul Constanța and Laminorul Roman. He also played for a year and half in Belgium for Beveren, Lokeren and Turnhout. He is currently the Head Coach of Liga II side Petrolul Ploiești.

Honours

KSK Beveren
Division II: 1996–97

CSA Steaua București
Divizia A: 1997–98

References

External links
 
 

1972 births
Living people
Sportspeople from Constanța
Romanian footballers
Association football midfielders
Liga I players
FCV Farul Constanța players
CS Portul Constanța players
FC Steaua București players
Liga II players
FC Callatis Mangalia players
CSM Roman (football) players
Challenger Pro League players
K.S.C. Lokeren Oost-Vlaanderen players
K.S.K. Beveren players
KFC Turnhout players
Romanian expatriate footballers
Romanian expatriate sportspeople in Belgium
Expatriate footballers in Belgium
Romanian football managers
FC Botoșani managers
AFC Turris-Oltul Turnu Măgurele managers
FC Petrolul Ploiești managers